Proschaliphora citricostata is a moth in the subfamily Arctiinae. It was described by George Hampson in 1901. It is found in Kenya.

References

Endemic moths of Kenya
Moths described in 1901
Arctiini